Rare Beauty is an American cosmetics company founded and owned by Selena Gomez. Inspired by her third studio album, Rare (2020), the company aims to "break down unrealistic standards of perfection" by promoting inclusivity and addressing mental health initiatives and education.

Rare Beauty launched on September 3, 2020, exclusively through their official website and in Sephora stores in North America. Since then, it has been made available to countries in Europe, Asia, and the Middle East. A percentage of all sales are donated to the Rare Beauty Impact Fund, which is apart of their "commitment to give people access to the resources they need to support their mental health."

History 
Rare Beauty was founded on February 22, 2019, by American singer and actress Selena Gomez. On February 4, 2020, she formally announced her company on social media. In its accompanying video, Gomez revealed that she's been working on the cosmetics line for the last two years, and that she "found the right partners and the right team — we now have 28 amazing people that are working for the brand." On the new venture, Gomez explained that Rare Beauty would encompass an entire lifestyle, and that it "isn’t about how other people see you — it’s about how you see yourself. I want us all to stop comparing ourselves to each other and to start embracing our own uniqueness. You are not defined by a photo, a like, or a comment.” In an interview with Allure, Gomez stated that "beauty doesn’t have to be defined by a like or a comment, or your body. We were always under the notion that this was going to be also about mental health and creating a safe place for people to connect." She also emphasized that her "main purpose when I started Rare Beauty was to break down the unrealistic standards of beauty we see in society today", motivated by the "pressure on us to be “perfect”.

In August 2020, Gomez revealed on Instagram that Rare Beauty would be launching on September 3 on its official website and in Sephora stores across North America. Its original included 48 shades of foundation, matte lip creams, eyebrow definers, liquid blush, and lip balms. The cruelty-free and vegan products were packaged with recyclable materials certified by the Forest Stewardship Council (FSC), and was printed with water-based ink. As the company grew, Rare Beauty expanded its markets to the Middle East, Europe, and Southeast Asia. In February 2022, the company launched in the United Kingdom exclusively through Space.NK. Going viral on TikTok, the Rare Beauty blush has made a significant impact on the brands imaging, some even say the product is "too pigmented."

As apart of her commitment to mental health awareness and education, Gomez created the Rare Impact Fund to help "young people gain access to mental health resources", and is committed to raise US$100 million over the next ten years. To achieve that goal, a percentage of all Rare Beauty sales, along with "philanthropic foundations, corporate partners, and individuals in our community" will be donated towards the fund. In its first year, the non-profit affiliate provided $1.2 million in grants to eight mental health and education-focused organizations, including the Yale Center for Emotional Intelligence and Didi Hirsch Mental Health Services. For Mental Health Awareness Month, Rare Beauty launched its first GoFundMe campaign and pledged to match $200,000 of donations. The company also launched an education and advocacy initiative called Mental Health 101, which is "dedicated to supporting mental health education and encouraging financial support for more mental health services in educational services."

Awards and nominations

Rare Impact by Rare Beauty Awards

Notes

References

External links

Cosmetics brands
Organizations established in 2019
Selena Gomez